Gilbert T. Skeate (May 19, 1901 – January 30, 1952) was an American football fullback in the National Football League. He played with the Green Bay Packers during the 1927 NFL season.  He played college football at Gonzaga University.

References

1901 births
1952 deaths
People from Staples, Minnesota
Green Bay Packers players
American football fullbacks
Gonzaga Bulldogs football players